{{DISPLAYTITLE:C12H20N2O3}}
The molecular formula C12H20N2O3 (molar mass: 240.30 g/mol, exact mass: 240.1474 u) may refer to:

 Pirbuterol
 Tetrabarbital